Mary Geraldine (Bonnie) Baker, née George (July 10, 1918 – December 17, 2003) was an all-star catcher in the All-American Girls Professional Baseball League (AAGPBL) from 1943 to 1952.

Career
She also served as player-manager with the Kalamazoo Lassies in 1950, becoming the only woman in league history to do so. Besides, she was one of 68 Canadian players in the AAGPBL, while her sister, Genevieve George, also played in the league for the Lassies.  With the majority of major-league baseball players in the military during World War II, Phil Wrigley owner of the Chicago Cubs, established the AAGPBL in 1943. It continued play until 1954. The first year it played by softball rules, but the rules were gradually changed until they were nearly identical with professional baseball rules.

Saskatchewan Mary Baker's eight brothers and sisters were all baseball catchers, so it stood to reason that Baker would become one too. She was scouted by a professional scout, Hub Bishop who also scouted notable Saskatchewan athletes like Gordie Howe of the Detroit Red Wings. When she joined the AAGPBL, she promised her husband, who was fighting overseas in World War II, that she would quit the game when he returned. Baker, 5'5", 135 lbs. (165 cm, 61 kg), a former model, was often chosen by the league to pose for publicity shots and act as a league spokesperson. Baker was the league's most publicized player and was referred to as "Pretty Bonnie Baker" by the press. She appeared on the popular television show What's My Line? on August 17, 1952, and her picture also appeared in Life magazine.

She began her career with the South Bend Blue Sox in the league's first season, and stayed with the team until 1950. Although she was easily the most recognized AAGPBL player, glamour never stopped her from doing her job. In 1946 Baker had an all-star season, stealing a league-leading 94 bases, batting .286 and with a .965 fielding percentage.  During the 1950 season, Baker was traded to the Kalamazoo Lassies to act as player-manager. The struggling Lassies placed last in the league with a 36–73 record. The following year the league passed a rule banning female managers. Baker skipped the 1951 season to have a daughter, Maureen (Chickie), but returned to the Lassies for one year in 1952.

She was an all star in 1943 and 1946, and played in 930 games in her career. She hit .235 for her career, with 1 home run, 244 RBI and 465 runs. Her career fielding average was .953.    She returned to Saskatchewan, where she led the Regina Legion softball team to the World Ladies Softball title. In 1964-65 she worked for Regina radio station CKRM, as the first female sports broadcaster in Canada. She also managed the Wheat City Curling Club for 25 years.

Baker appeared as a contestant on the August 17, 1952 episode of the tv game show What's My Line?. Panelist Dorothy Kilgallen guessed that Baker was a professional baseball player.

Death and honors
Baker died of respiratory failure at 85. Fellow AAGPBL player Arleene Noga remembers her as "a complete player with all five tools — a real competitor." In 1998 she was inducted into the Canadian Baseball Hall of Fame. She is also a member of the Saskatchewan Sports Hall of Fame and the Saskatchewan Baseball Hall of Fame, and is part of the special exhibit on the AAGPBL in the Baseball Hall of Fame in Cooperstown, New York.

The 1992 Geena Davis-Tom Hanks movie A League of Their Own was a fictional account of the AAGPBL. Davis's character, Dottie Hinson, is loosely based on Bonnie Baker.

In 2018, Baker was posthumously inducted into the Canada's Sports Hall of Fame.

References

External links
Her entry in the Encyclopedia of Saskatchewan
Her statistics at Encyclopedia of Baseball Catchers
Obituary from the Canadian Baseball Hall of Fame and Museum
TV appearance from "What's My Line?"

1918 births
2003 deaths
All-American Girls Professional Baseball League managers
All-American Girls Professional Baseball League players
Kalamazoo Lassies players
South Bend Blue Sox players
Baseball people from Saskatchewan
Canadian expatriate baseball players in the United States
Canadian radio sportscasters
Deaths from respiratory failure
Sportspeople from Regina, Saskatchewan
Women sports announcers
20th-century American women
21st-century American women